Radim Fiala (born 29 July 1969) is a Czech politician and businessman from Prostějov. From 2006 to 2013 he was a member of the Chamber of Deputies of the Czech Republic, elected as a candidate of the Civic Democratic Party (ODS). He left ODS in 2012 and then joined Dawn of Direct Democracy. He left Dawn in 2013 and co-founded  Freedom and Direct Democracy.

References

External links 

 Personal website

1969 births
20th-century Czech businesspeople
Living people
Czech eurosceptics
21st-century Czech businesspeople
21st-century Czech politicians
Freedom and Direct Democracy MPs
Civic Democratic Party (Czech Republic) MPs
Politicians from Prostějov
Anti-Islam sentiment in Europe
Members of the Chamber of Deputies of the Czech Republic (2006–2010)
Members of the Chamber of Deputies of the Czech Republic (2010–2013)
Members of the Chamber of Deputies of the Czech Republic (2013–2017)
Members of the Chamber of Deputies of the Czech Republic (2017–2021)
Members of the Chamber of Deputies of the Czech Republic (2021–2025)
Mendel University Brno alumni